Christian Pire (1 September 1930 – 13 June 2000) was a French diver. He competed at the 1956 Summer Olympics and the 1960 Summer Olympics.

References

External links
 
 

1930 births
2000 deaths
French male divers
Olympic divers of France
Divers at the 1956 Summer Olympics
Divers at the 1960 Summer Olympics
Sportspeople from Tunis
20th-century French people